The 1969–70 NBA season was the Lakers' 22nd season in the NBA and tenth season in Los Angeles.

Offseason
After the tumultuous previous two seasons under the fiery head coach Butch Van Breda Kolff, the Lakers replaced him with the low key Joe Mullaney.

Draft picks

 1st round, 12th pick – Willie McCarter, G, Drake University
 1st round, 15th pick – Rick Roberson, C, University of Cincinnati
 2nd round, 27th pick – Dick Garrett, G, Southern Illinois University

Roster

Regular season
After barely losing the NBA title the previous season, the veteran Lakers had high hopes coming into the 1969–70 season. However, 9 games into the season, Wilt Chamberlain suffered a severe knee injury and it was thought he would miss the next 10–12 months. Elgin Baylor also missed 28 games due to injury, and Jerry West missed 8. They traded Bill Hewitt for double-double machine Happy Hairston midway through the season. 1st round draft pick Willie McCarter also missed almost the entire season.  But the Lakers received key contributions from rookies Rick Roberson and Dick Garrett, and managed to battle the Atlanta Hawks for 1st place in the Western Division for most of the season. Chamberlain returned for the final few games, and while the Lakers
finished 2nd in the division to Atlanta by 2 games, they were at full strength for the playoffs.

Season standings

x – clinched playoff spot

Record vs. opponents

Game log

Playoffs

|- align="center" bgcolor="#ccffcc"
| 1
| March 25
| Phoenix
| W 128–112
| Elgin Baylor (32)
| Wilt Chamberlain (19)
| Elgin Baylor (10)
| The Forum15,046
| 1–0
|- align="center" bgcolor="#ffcccc"
| 2
| March 29
| Phoenix
| L 101–114
| Jerry West (33)
| Wilt Chamberlain (25)
| Jerry West (11)
| The Forum17,501
| 1–1
|- align="center" bgcolor="#ffcccc"
| 3
| April 2
| @ Phoenix
| L 98–112
| Jerry West (31)
| Wilt Chamberlain (12)
| Chamberlain, West (7)
| Arizona Veterans Memorial Coliseum12,324
| 1–2
|- align="center" bgcolor="#ffcccc"
| 4
| April 4
| @ Phoenix
| L 102–112
| Wilt Chamberlain (29)
| Wilt Chamberlain (19)
| Keith Erickson (6)
| Arizona Veterans Memorial Coliseum12,356
| 1–3
|- align="center" bgcolor="#ccffcc"
| 5
| April 5
| Phoenix
| W 138–121
| Chamberlain, West (36)
| Mel Counts (17)
| Jerry West (18)
| The Forum17,475
| 2–3
|- align="center" bgcolor="#ccffcc"
| 6
| April 7
| @ Phoenix
| W 104–93
| Jerry West (35)
| Wilt Chamberlain (26)
| Wilt Chamberlain (11)
| Arizona Veterans Memorial Coliseum12,386
| 3–3
|- align="center" bgcolor="#ccffcc"
| 7
| April 9
| Phoenix
| W 129–94
| Wilt Chamberlain (30)
| Wilt Chamberlain (27)
| Jerry West (15)
| The Forum17,519
| 4–3
|-

|- align="center" bgcolor="#ccffcc"
| 1
| April 12
| @ Atlanta
| W 119–115
| Jerry West (38)
| Wilt Chamberlain (17)
| Wilt Chamberlain (8)
| Alexander Memorial Coliseum7,197
| 1–0
|- align="center" bgcolor="#ccffcc"
| 2
| April 14
| @ Atlanta
| W 105–94
| Chamberlain, West (24)
| Wilt Chamberlain (24)
| Keith Erickson (7)
| Alexander Memorial Coliseum7,197
| 2–0
|- align="center" bgcolor="#ccffcc"
| 3
| April 17
| Atlanta
| W 115–114 (OT)
| Jerry West (35)
| Wilt Chamberlain (26)
| Jerry West (13)
| The Forum17,183
| 3–0
|- align="center" bgcolor="#ccffcc"
| 4
| April 19
| Atlanta
| W 133–114
| Jerry West (39)
| Wilt Chamberlain (21)
| Jerry West (12)
| The Forum17,410
| 4–0
|-

|- align="center" bgcolor="#ffcccc"
| 1
| April 24
| @ New York
| L 112–124
| Jerry West (33)
| Wilt Chamberlain (24)
| Wilt Chamberlain (5)
| Madison Square Garden19,500
| 0–1
|- align="center" bgcolor="#ccffcc"
| 2
| April 27
| @ New York
| W 105–103
| Jerry West (34)
| Wilt Chamberlain (24)
| Garrett, Erickson (6)
| Madison Square Garden19,500
| 1–1
|- align="center" bgcolor="#ffcccc"
| 3
| April 29
| New York
| L 108–111 (OT)
| Jerry West (34)
| Wilt Chamberlain (26)
| Elgin Baylor (11)
| The Forum17,500
| 1–2
|- align="center" bgcolor="#ccffcc"
| 4
| May 1
| New York
| W 121–115 (OT)
| Jerry West (37)
| Wilt Chamberlain (25)
| Jerry West (18)
| The Forum17,509
| 2–2
|- align="center" bgcolor="#ffcccc"
| 5
| May 4
| @ New York
| L 100–107
| Wilt Chamberlain (22)
| Wilt Chamberlain (19)
| Keith Erickson (6)
| Madison Square Garden19,500
| 2–3
|- align="center" bgcolor="#ccffcc"
| 6
| May 6
| New York
| W 135–113
| Wilt Chamberlain (45)
| Wilt Chamberlain (27)
| Jerry West (13)
| The Forum17,509
| 3–3
|- align="center" bgcolor="#ffcccc"
| 7
| May 8
| @ New York
| L 99–113
| Jerry West (28)
| Wilt Chamberlain (24)
| Keith Erickson (6)
| Madison Square Garden19,500
| 3–4
|-

Awards and records
 Jerry West, All-NBA First Team
 Jerry West, NBA All-Defensive First Team
 Jerry West, NBA All-Star Game
 Elgin Baylor, NBA All-Star Game
 Dick Garrett, NBA All-Rookie Team 1st Team

References

Los Angeles Lakers seasons
Los Angeles
Los Angle
Los Angle